Krimo is a given name. Notable people with the name include:

Krimo Bernaoui (born 1967), Algerian volleyball player
Krimo Rebih (1932–2012), Algerian footballer